Edwin Erle Sparks (July 16, 1860 – June 15, 1924) was the eighth president of the Pennsylvania State University, serving from 1908 until 1920.

Biography
Sparks was born in Newark, Ohio, on July 16, 1860.  After high school, he attended Ohio Wesleyan University for two years and the Ohio State University, Class of 1884.  He was a Phi Beta Kappa, and received his M.A. from Harvard University, his Ph.D. from the University of Chicago and his LL.D. from Lehigh University. He married Katherine Bullard Cotton on January 1, 1890.

Sparks became a member of the Chi Phi Fraternity at Ohio Weslayen and a founder and charter member of the Iota chapter at the Ohio State University.  He served as the Grand Gamma (National Secretary) of the Fraternity and was also instrumental in bringing Chi Phi to Penn State just before his death in 1924.  In his memory, Chi Phi established the Sparks Memorial Medal, presented to the undergraduate member in each chapter who had, during the preceding year, the highest grade point average.

References
 Penn State Presidents and their achievements
 The Chronicles of Chi Phi, 1976

External links 
 
 

1860 births
1924 deaths
Harvard University alumni
University of Chicago alumni
Lehigh University alumni
Presidents of Pennsylvania State University
People from Newark, Ohio
Ohio State University alumni